The Competitiveness Council (COMPET) is a configuration of the Council of the European Union that meets at least four times a year. This council brings together ministers responsible for trade, economy, industry, research and innovation and space from all the EU member states. It deals with four policy areas: internal market, industry, research and innovation and space.

This council was created in June 2002 through the merging of three previous configurations (Internal Market, Industry and Research).

References

External links
 About the Competitiveness Council
 Press releases of the Competitiveness Council

Council of the European Union